József Dravecz, born Márk Drávecz, also known in Slovene as Jožef Marko Dravec (20 March 1697 – 17 July 1779) was a Slovene Roman Catholic priest, canon, dean, and writer in the Kingdom of Hungary.

Biography
Dravecz was born in Beltinci in the area of the Bishopric of Zagreb. His native language was Prekmurje Slovene. He mostly lived in the Hungarian settlements of Vál and Pázmánd. He died in Veszprém.

Dravecz renovated the church in Vál. Wrote in Latin.

Works 
 Per ardua ad sublime dignitatis fastigium evecto Martino Biro, recens in episcopum Veszprimiensem consecrato. Buda, 1745.
 Promulgatio jubilaei universalis anni 1776 per dioecesim Veszprimiensem. Jaurini.

See also 
 List of Slovene writers and poets in Hungary

References

External links 
 Szinnyei, József: Magyar írók élete és munkái Dravecz József

1697 births
1779 deaths
People from the Municipality of Beltinci
18th-century Slovenian Roman Catholic priests
Slovenian writers and poets in Hungary